Adnan Terzić (born 5 April 1960) is a Bosnian politician who served as the 6th Chairman of the Council of Ministers of Bosnia and Herzegovina from 23 December 2002 until 11 January 2007.

He is a member of the Union for a Better Future of BiH (SBB BiH). Before becoming a member of SBB BiH, he was a long time member of the Party of Democratic Action (SDA).

Early life and education
Terzić was born on 5 April 1960 in Zagreb, PR Croatia, FPR Yugoslavia to Bosniak parents. His parents moved to Sarajevo when he was a kid, and there he would graduate from the Land Survey Engineering department at the University of Sarajevo in 1986.

Career
From 1986 until 1990, Terzić was an advisor in the municipal government in Travnik. He joined the Party of Democratic Action (SDA) in 1991, shortly after it was founded. Between 1992 and 1995, he served in the Army of the Republic of Bosnia and Herzegovina during the Bosnian War.

Following the war, Terzić was the president of the municipal council in Travnik from 1996 to 2001. He also served as Governor of Central Bosnia Canton. At the same time he was the president of the club of SDA representatives in the Federal Parliament. On 13 October 2001, he became the Vice-president of SDA, staying on that position until 2009. He then served as the 6th Chairman of the Council of Ministers of Bosnia and Herzegovina from 23 December 2002 to 11 January 2007. In 2009, Terzić left SDA and joined Fahrudin Radončić's newly established Union for a Better Future of BiH (SBB BiH) one year later, and was also named as the party's new Vice-president.

Personal life
Terzić lives in Sarajevo with his wife Maida and their son Tarik.

References

External links

Official Web Site
Council of Ministers official Web Site

1960 births
Living people
Politicians from Zagreb
University of Sarajevo alumni
Bosniaks of Croatia
Bosniaks of Bosnia and Herzegovina
Army of the Republic of Bosnia and Herzegovina soldiers
Party of Democratic Action politicians
Union for a Better Future of BiH politicians